Kenan Kirim (born 24 January 1999) is an Austrian footballer who plays as a midfielder for SKU Amstetten on loan from SK Rapid Wien.

Personal life
Born in Austria, Kirim is of Turkish descent.

References

Living people
1999 births
People from Kitzbühel District
Austrian footballers
Austria youth international footballers
Austrian people of Turkish descent
Association football midfielders
FC Liefering players
2. Liga (Austria) players
Footballers from Tyrol (state)